Čoka is a town and municipality located in the North Banat District of the autonomous province of Vojvodina, Serbia. The town has a population of 4,028, while Čoka municipality has 11,398 inhabitants.

History
The first written record about Čoka was made in 1247. It was part of a feudal tenure of which landowners were often changed. Later the settlement was abandoned due to the dense Cuman incursions at the end of the 13th century, but it was rebuilt again in the 14th century. In 1552, it was under Ottoman administration.

In the first half of the 18th century, the Ottoman administration was replaced by the Habsburg one and according to 1717 data, there were 40 Serb houses in the village  of which number increased to 192 until the middle of the 18th century, and in 1787, the number of population increased to 1,191 people. According to 1910 census, Hungarians were the dominant ethnic group in the village, while there existed a sizable ethnic Serb community as well.

As of 1918, Čoka is part of the Kingdom of Serbs, Croats and Slovenes (later renamed to Yugoslavia). Until the end of World War II, it was part of Novi Kneževac municipality. Shortly afterwards, it  became the seat of an own municipality, whereby it became an industrial centre of the region as well, receiving a large influx of new population. In 1991, it had a population of 5,244 people but In the next decade, the number of dwellers started to dwindle and 2002 census recorded only 4,707 people in the settlement.

Inhabited places
Čoka municipality includes the town of Čoka and seven villages. The villages are:
Padej (Hungarian: Padé)
Jazovo (Hungarian: Hódegyháza)
Banatski Monoštor (Hungarian: Kanizsamonostor)
Vrbica (Hungarian: Egyházaskér)
Crna Bara (Hungarian: Feketetó)
Sanad (Hungarian: Szanád)
Ostojićevo (Hungarian: Tiszaszentmiklós)

Note: For the inhabited places with an absolute or relative Hungarian ethnic majority, the names are also given in Hungarian.

Demographics

According to the 2011 census results, the municipality of Čoka has 11,398 inhabitants.

Ethnic groups
Five local communities have a Hungarian majority: Čoka, Padej, Jazovo, Banatski Monoštor, and Vrbica. Crna Bara has a relative Hungarian majority. Sanad and Ostojićevo have Serb majorities, although the latter has over 20% Hungarians, while Čoka, Padej and Crna Bara have over 20% Serbs.

The ethnic composition of the municipality:

Twin towns – sister cities

Čoka is twinned with:
 Arilje, Serbia
 Bordány, Hungary
 Decs, Hungary
 Deta, Romania
 Sokobanja, Serbia
 Wisła, Poland

See also
Municipalities of Serbia
List of places in Serbia
List of cities, towns and villages in Vojvodina
North Banat District

References

External links

 
 History of Čoka 

 
Populated places in Serbian Banat
Populated places in North Banat District
Municipalities and cities of Vojvodina
Hungarian communities in Serbia
Towns in Serbia